Salvatore Boccaccio (June 18, 1938 Rome - October 18, 2008 Frosinone, Italy) was the Roman Catholic bishop of the Roman Catholic Diocese of Frosinone-Veroli-Ferentino from July 9, 1999, until his death on October 18, 2008, at the age of 70 years.

External links 
 Catholic Hierarchy: Bishop Salvatore Boccaccio †

1938 births
2008 deaths
Clergy from Rome
Bishops in Lazio
21st-century Italian Roman Catholic bishops